Abderrahmane Karim Hadjbouzit (born 10 February 1991) is an Algerian racing cyclist, who currently rides for UCI Continental team . He rode at the 2013 UCI Road World Championships.

References

External links
 

1991 births
Living people
Algerian male cyclists
Place of birth missing (living people)
21st-century Algerian people